The Anglican Diocese of Bunbury is a diocese of the Anglican Church of Australia which was founded in 1904 and covers the south of the State of Western Australia. Together with Perth and North West Australia, it is one of the three diocese of the Province of Western Australia. The diocese's cathedral since 1963 is St Boniface's Cathedral in Bunbury. The current Bishop of Bunbury, since 3 November 2018, is Ian Coutts.

Cathedral
The cathedral church of the dioceses is Saint Boniface Cathedral in Bunbury. The cathedral is of brick construction in a modernist style with a prominent clock tower at the east end crowning the sanctuary. The foundation stone was laid in 1961 and the cathedral was consecrated on 14 October 1962. Prior to 1962, the diocese was based at St Paul's Pro-Cathedral, which was constructed in 1866 on the site of an earlier church. St Paul's, previously only a parish church, had been named a pro-cathedral in 1903 in preparation for Bunbury gaining diocesan status the following year. It was demolished in 1963.

Bishops of Bunbury

Assistant bishops
From 1968 to 1979, Warwick Bastian was coadjutor bishop, with the title Bishop of Albany.

See also
St Boniface's Church, Bunbury England
Saint Boniface Cathedral, Winnipeg

References

Further reading
Tredwell, J.J., The Cathedral Church of Saint Boniface, Bunbury, Western Australia, 1972
Bartlett, Joan,  JOURNEY, A History of the Anglican Diocese of Bunbury, Western Australia, 2004, .

External links
 – official site
Bishop's personal website
St John's, Albany

 
1904 establishments in Australia
Province of Western Australia